McPeek is a surname. Notable people with the surname include:

Ben McPeek (1934–1981), Canadian composer, conductor, and pianist
Kenneth McPeek (born 1962), American Thoroughbred racehorse trainer
Mark McPeek, American biologist

See also
McPeak